Michael Collins (born 25 June 1953, Dublin, Ireland) is a retired Irish diplomat.  Collins retired after his tenure as Ambassador to Germany (2013-2019). He was also Ambassador to the United States from 2007 to 2013, Saudi Arabia from 1995 to 1999 and to the Czech Republic from 1999 to 2001.

As of 18 November 2019, he has been Director General of The Institute of International and European Affairs.

Collins attended Blackrock College, Dublin and Trinity College, Dublin.

References

External links
Brexit: The human dimension of mission possible

Ambassadors of Ireland to Germany
Ambassadors of Ireland to the United States
Ambassadors of Ireland to the Czech Republic
Ambassadors of Ireland to Saudi Arabia
Alumni of Trinity College Dublin
Institute of European Affairs
1953 births
Living people